Tatakoto Airport  is an airport serving the village of Tumukuru, located on the island of Tatakoto, in the Tuamotu group of atolls in French Polynesia,  from Tahiti.

Tatakoto Airport was inaugurated in 1979.

Airlines and destinations

Passenger

References

External links
 Atoll list (in French)
 Classification of the French Polynesian atolls by Salvat (1985)

Airports in French Polynesia
Atolls of the Tuamotus